Daniel Domingo Salamanca Urey (8 July 1869 – 17 July 1935) was a Bolivian politician who served as the 33rd president of Bolivia from 1931 to 1934 until he was overthrown in a coup d'état on November 27, 1934, during the country's disastrous Chaco War with Paraguay.

Political career
Born in Cochabamba, Salamanca studied law, before being elected to Bolivia's Chamber of Deputies in 1899 for the  Liberal Party. Two years later, President José Manuel Pando appointed him Finance Minister. Salamanca eventually split  with the Liberals, however, and helped to found the new Republican Party, running unsuccessfully for Vice-President in  1917. Following the split of a faction opposed to the growing (some would say ruthless) ambitions of Republican leader  Bautista Saavedra, the ascetic, professorial Salamanca founded, with a number of other men including Juan Maria Escalier,  the so-called Genuine Republican Party (Partido Republicano Genuino). Salamanca himself ran for president on the Genuino  ticket in the elections of 1925, but lost to Saavedra's handpicked successor, Hernando Siles.

Shaken by his defeats, Salamanca retired from politics and dedicated himself to teaching law. In the aftermath of  the military overthrow of Hernando Siles in 1930, largely as a result of the Great Depression,  Salamanca was asked to head a Republicano Genuino-Liberal coalition, with him at the head of the ticket and Liberal leader  José Luis Tejada as his vice-presidential running mate. Salamanca was elected and took office in March 1931.

Presidency
Immediately upon assuming office, Salamanca introduced an unpopular austerity program and clamped down on political  opposition to his government. In what was likely a measure to avert public attention to the economic problems still facing the country, he also revived hostilities with Paraguay in the disputed Chaco region. Indeed, Salamanca had been for a long time one of the "hawks" in Bolivian politics, advocating firmness against Paraguay in the territorial dispute. Upon  taking office, his motto became "We must stand firm in the Chaco." Given that the parched region of the Gran Chaco (largely uninhabited) had been under dispute between Bolivia and Paraguay ever since the creation of both republics, each proceeded to  establish a line of small garrisons (fortines), simply to establish a national presence and press their claims. Sporadic battles would occur, but cooler heads tended to prevail, especially because neither Bolivia nor  Paraguay (the only landlocked and poorest countries in South America) could afford a full-scale war over the Chaco. Neither, however, relinquished much in their claim to the entire Chaco region either.

All of this changed when oil was found on the foothills of the Andes, deep in Bolivian territory. It was then widely assumed that the nearby Chaco also contained oil, possibly in vast quantities. In addition, the explosive economic and political situation prompted President Salamanca to use the dispute to shore up national unity and distract attention from his government's shortcomings. He ordered a stepped-up effort at establishing more fortines wherever Paraguay wasn't established already. A Bolivian army exploration unit was sent deep into the Chaco early in 1932, whereupon they chanced to find a large lake in the middle of the desert-like scrubland. It was a perfect location for a permanent garrison. Unfortunately, the lake—named Pitiantuta by the Paraguayans—turned out to be occupied by the  Paraguayan military. Upon the arrival of the Bolivian expedition, a battle ensued and the Paraguayan troops fled. This, in essence, started the disastrous Chaco War (1932–1935).

The quick escalation of the war only exacerbated already severe economic problems in Bolivia (and in Paraguay), while causing  many thousands of casualties. To make matters worse, Salamanca had very poor relations with the Bolivian high command from the beginning of the conflict, when he demoted a Bolivian general and placed the German Hans Kundt at the head of the country's armed forces at war.  Kundt had led a military mission to Bolivia prior to World War I. A string of devastating defeats on the southern front of the war at the hands of the Paraguayans, who knew the terrain much better than the Bolivians (most of whom hailed from the Altiplano Highlands) precipitated Kundt's replacement by General Enrique Peñaranda at the end of 1933. Salamanca's relationship with the general only got worse, as the mercurial president (then in his mid 60s) tended to blame the military leadership for the continuing setbacks on the field. Things came to a head when Salamanca decided to replace Peñaranda and a number of his increasingly mutinous commandants.

Coup
On 27 November 1934, the Bolivian generals deposed Salamanca while he visited their headquarters at Villamontes to explain the reasons for the changes. Peñaranda and his coconspirators (Colonel Toro, Major Busch, and others) in the end decided to keep democratic appearances intact, and replaced Salamanca with his Vice President, the decidedly more pliable José Luis Tejada of the Liberal Party. It has been alleged that Tejada was in on the plot itself.

The elderly and sickly Salamanca at that point was allowed to "retire" to his native Cochabamba, where he died of stomach cancer less than a  year later on July 1935, only days after the establishment of the cease-fire. A highly controversial figure, he was blamed by many for the war, while others respected him enormously as a man who did all he could to maintain his country's foothold on the Chaco without resorting to warfare but was betrayed by a mutinous and incompetent military high command. The rather dour, intellectual Salamanca is perhaps best remembered by two celebrated phrases of his: musing upon one of the many disastrous losses of his armies, he is reported to have said "I gave them everything they  asked for – weapons, trucks, whatever they wanted; the one and only thing I could not give them was brains." He is also supposed to have remarked dryly to Peñaranda, upon the encirclement of the house where he was staying at Villamontes during the coup: "Congratulations General; you just completed your first and only successful military siege of the entire war."

See also
 History of Bolivia

References

External links

 

1869 births
1935 deaths
20th-century Bolivian politicians
20th-century Bolivian lawyers
19th-century Bolivian lawyers
Candidates in the May 1925 Bolivian presidential election
Candidates in the December 1925 Bolivian presidential election
Candidates in the 1931 Bolivian presidential election
Deaths from cancer in Bolivia
Deaths from stomach cancer
Finance ministers of Bolivia
Leaders ousted by a coup
Liberal Party (Bolivia) politicians
Members of the Chamber of Deputies (Bolivia)
People from Cochabamba
People of the Chaco War
Presidents of Bolivia
Republican Party (Bolivia) politicians